Alaptolma (or Tolma) is a legendary Magyar tribal chieftain who lived in the first part of the 10th century.

According to the medieval Gesta Hungarorum, Alaptolma, son of Ketel, built a castle on the estate of his father, at the confluence of the Danube and Váh rivers. This ancient castle became the core of the town of Komárom. Today Ketel and Alaptolma are honoured as the legendary founders of the city.

References

10th-century Hungarian people
Magyar tribal chieftains
Gesta Hungarorum
Koppán (genus)